North is a town in Orangeburg County, South Carolina, United States. The population was 696 at the 2020 census.

In 1891, the South Bound Railway Company came through the area with the assistance of John F. North. In 1892, John North, along with George W. Pou and Sampson A. Livingston, donated 100
acres (40.5 ha) for the railway depot and townsite. A U.S. Post Office branch was also later established. The next year John North, a Confederate veteran and businessman, was elected the first mayor of his namesake town of North, South Carolina. The town has been noted for its unusual place name.

The United States Air Force base North Auxiliary Airfield is located near the town.

Geography
North is located at  (33.615983, -81.103588).

Demographics

2020 census

As of the 2020 United States census, there were 696 people, 329 households, and 156 families residing in the town.

2000 census
As of the census of 2000, there were 813 people, 356 households, and 223 families residing in the town. The population density was 953.7 people per square mile (369.3/km2). There were 412 housing units at an average density of 483.3 per square mile (187.1/km2). The racial makeup of the town was 52.64% White, 46.37% African American, 0.37% Native American, and 0.62% from two or more races. Hispanic or Latino of any race were 0.86% of the population.

There were 356 households, out of which 25.3% had children under the age of 18 living with them, 38.5% were married couples living together, 19.7% had a female householder with no husband present, and 37.1% were non-families. 34.6% of all households were made up of individuals, and 18.8% had someone living alone who was 65 years of age or older. The average household size was 2.28 and the average family size was 2.94.

In the town, the population was spread out, with 23.5% under the age of 18, 9.7% from 18 to 24, 23.1% from 25 to 44, 25.3% from 45 to 64, and 18.3% who were 65 years of age or older. The median age was 40 years. For every 100 females, there were 80.7 males. For every 100 females age 18 and over, there were 74.7 males.

The median income for a household in the town was $21,136, and the median income for a family was $30,750. Males had a median income of $24,286 versus $21,406 for females. The per capita income for the town was $14,237. About 27.5% of families and 30.5% of the population were below the poverty line, including 39.3% of those under age 18 and 24.2% of those age 65 or over.

Government and infrastructure

Postal service 
The United States Postal Service operates the North Post Office at 7903 Salley Road.

Public library 
North has a public library, a branch of the Orangeburg County Library.

Education

Primary and secondary schools 
Dover Elementary School

North Middle/High School

Notable people
 Singer and actress Eartha Kitt was born in North.
 NFL Player and Super Bowl XXXVII Champion Chuck Darby was born in North.
 Freddie Martino, NFL player

References

External links

 Town website
 North photo gallery
 Explanation of North, South Carolina

Towns in Orangeburg County, South Carolina
Towns in South Carolina